Latiromitra is a genus of sea snails, marine gastropod mollusks in the family Costellariidae.

Species
Species within the genus Latiromitra include:
 Latiromitra aratiuncula (Quinn, 1981)
 Latiromitra barthelowi (Bartsch, 1942)
 Latiromitra cacozeliana Bouchet & Kantor, 2000
 Latiromitra costata (Dall, 1890)
 Latiromitra crosnieri Bouchet & Kantor, 2000
 Latiromitra cryptodon (P. Fischer, 1882)
 Latiromitra delicatula (Shikama, 1971)
 Latiromitra meekiana (Dall, 1889)
 Latiromitra niveobabelis Garcia, 2015
 Latiromitra okinavensis (MacNeil, 1961)
 Latiromitra paiciorum Bouchet & Kantor, 2000
 † Latiromitra pauciplicata (Yokoyama, 1928) 
 Latiromitra styliola (Dall, 1927)
 Species brought into synonymy
 Latiromitra bairdii (Dall, 1889): synonym of Volutomitra bairdii (Dall, 1889)
 Latiromitra specialis Locard, 1897: synonym of Latiromitra cryptodon (P. Fischer, 1882)

Classification
Biota > Animalia (Kingdom) > Mollusca (Phylum) > Gastropoda (Class) > Caenogastropoda (Subclass) > Neogastropoda (Order) > Turbinelloidea (Superfamily) > Costellariidae (Family) > Latiromitra (Genus)

References

 Quinn J.F. (1981) A new genus of Turbinellidae (Gastropoda: Prosobranchia), with the description of a new species from the Caribbean Sea. The Nautilus 95(2): 72-77.
 Bouchet P. & Kantor Yu.I. (2000) The anatomy and systematics of Latiromitra, a genus of tropical deep-water Ptychatractinae (Gastropoda: Turbinellidae). The Veliger 49(1): 1-23.
 Gofas, S.; Le Renard, J.; Bouchet, P. (2001). Mollusca, in: Costello, M.J. et al. (Ed.) (2001). European register of marine species: a check-list of the marine species in Europe and a bibliography of guides to their identification. Collection Patrimoines Naturels, 50: pp. 180–213

Ptychatractidae